Mutual Benefit is a music project created by singer-songwriter Jordan Lee. The band consists of various musicians gathered by Jordan Lee, and has no concrete band line-up. 

The band's first studio LP Love's Crushing Diamond has gained critical praise; being named Stereogum's Band to Watch, and Pitchfork's best new music. Contributions to Love's Crushing Diamond were made by musicians Jake Falby (violins), George Folickman (bass), Marc Merza (electric guitar), Virginia de la Pozas (voice), Cory Siegler (voice), Julie Byrne (voice), Cameron Potter (drums), and Dillon Zahner (hand drums + percussion).

History 
Mutual Benefit was first created as a musical project by Jordan Lee while he was living in Austin, Texas. Lee then moved to Boston in order to meet up with some musicians he wanted to play with. The band consisted of fluid band members, and the band's line-ups on tours were based on which musicians were available at the time. While touring on the road in late 2011, Lee began recording for the album Love's Crushing Diamond. Lyrics and musical composition for the album were written while Lee was living in St. Louis, but the recording began at the Ohm Recording Studio in Austin,  Texas. The album was finished in Boston and released on October 7, 2013. The album became the first Bandcamp release to be named "Best New Music" by Pitchfork.

Discography

Digital albums 
 Figure in Black (2009) 
 Drifting EP (2010)
 Spider Heaven (2010)
 Mutual Spirits (2011)
 I saw the sea (2011)
 The Cowboy's Prayer (2011)

LP records 
 Love's Crushing Diamond (2013)
 Skip a Sinking Stone (2016)
 Thunder Follows The Light (2018)

References

American indie rock groups
Father/Daughter Records artists
Mom + Pop Music artists